(born 3 February 1946 in Yatomi, Aichi, Japan) is a Japanese volleyball player and Olympic champion.

She was a member of the Japanese winning team at the 1976 Olympic games.

References

External links

1946 births
Living people
Olympic volleyball players of Japan
Volleyball players at the 1972 Summer Olympics
Volleyball players at the 1976 Summer Olympics
Olympic gold medalists for Japan
Japanese women's volleyball players
Olympic medalists in volleyball
People from Yatomi
Sportspeople from Aichi Prefecture
Asian Games medalists in volleyball
Volleyball players at the 1966 Asian Games
Volleyball players at the 1970 Asian Games
Volleyball players at the 1974 Asian Games
Medalists at the 1966 Asian Games
Medalists at the 1970 Asian Games
Medalists at the 1974 Asian Games
Asian Games gold medalists for Japan
Medalists at the 1976 Summer Olympics
Medalists at the 1972 Summer Olympics
Olympic silver medalists for Japan
20th-century Japanese women